The 1983 Macau Grand Prix Formula Three was the 30th Macau Grand Prix race to be held on the streets of Macau on 20 November 1983. It was the first edition for Formula Three cars.

Entry list

Race results

Qualifying

Leg 1

Leg 2

Overall Race Result

References

External links
 The official website of the Macau Grand Prix

Macau Grand Prix
Grand
Macau